The National Institute for Biological Standards and Control (NIBSC) is a government agency that works in the field of biological standardisation and is part of the United Kingdom's Medicines and Healthcare products Regulatory Agency (MHRA). It is responsible for developing and producing over 90% of the biological international standards in use around the world.

The Institute is the UK's Official Medicines Control Laboratory, responsible for independent regulatory testing of biological medicines within the framework of the European Union. It is also host to the UK's stem cell bank and is a key research centre in the field of pandemic influenza.

History
The NIBSC began work in May 1972. The National Biological Standards Board was formed in 1975 at the NIMR in Mill Hill. A site was selected and the new £25m building opened in 1987, although it was officially opened in 1988. It has 4,500 square metres of laboratories. NIBSC employs around 300 staff, 200 of whom are scientists.

In February 2008, it featured in a thirty-minute programme on BBC Radio 4 in the Secret Science two-part series (the other programme was about the Health Protection Agency's Centre for Emergency Preparedness and Response at Porton Down).

In April 2009, NIBSC became a centre of the UK Health Protection Agency. In April 2013, the NIBSC left that agency and was merged with the UK's Medicines and Healthcare products Regulatory Agency (MHRA).

Functions
It produces over 90% of the WHO's International Standards for substances such as antibiotics, enzymes, antibodies and hormones, and methods such as blood transfusions. These standards form a vital part of global health efforts and pharmaceutical research, and over 10,000 standards a month are shipped worldwide.

It is the UK's Official Medicines Control Laboratory.

Facilities
New buildings for the UK Stem Cell Bank (which has been on the site since May 2004 and was Europe's first stem cell bank) and Influenza Resource Centre were built on the site in a £12m development by Morgan Ashurst and opened in December 2009.

See also
 European Directorate for the Quality of Medicines & HealthCare
 European Medicines Agency

References

External links
 
 Page at the HPA
 BBC May 2009 video
 Genetic discovery in May 2009
 Stem Cell Bank opens in May 2004
 Stem Cell Bank announced in September 2002

Biological research institutes in the United Kingdom
Biotechnology organizations
Buildings and structures in Hertfordshire
Department of Health and Social Care
Medical and health organisations based in the United Kingdom
Medical research institutes in the United Kingdom
Microbiology institutes
National Influenza Centres
Organisations based in Hertfordshire
Organizations established in 1972
Regulators of biotechnology products
Research institutes in Hertfordshire
Regulators of the United Kingdom